Indak is a Filipino dance musical film directed by Paul Basinillo, starring Sam Concepcion and Nadine Lustre, and produced by Viva Films.

Cast 

 Sam Concepcion as Kevin "Vin"
 Nadine Lustre as Janice "Jen"
 Yayo Aguila
 Mayton Eugenio as Abbie
 Julian Trono as Simon
 Karencitta
 Keiko Nakajima as Pat
Zarah Tolentino as Zeyee
Rose Van Ginkel as Dany
Nathalie Alvarez as Reg
Nicole Omillo as Steph
Aubrey Caraan as Carmel
Kedebon Colim as DJ Scratch
Christian Morones as Karl
Race Matias as Fred

Production

Development 
In November 2018, Viva Films held a story conference to announce its upcoming film Indak, to be directed by music video and concert director Paul Basinillo. The project is Basinillio's first full-length feature film. The stars of the movie, Lustre and Concepcion, along with Basinillio, told the press that the movie will center around competitive dancing.

Promotion 
Before the film was even announced, Lustre and Concepcion were featured in a campaign ad for ScratchIt, a lottery game that involves scratching a play area on a ticket to reveal a winning symbol or pattern equivalent to a cash prize that is paid to the player immediately. At the story conference for the movie, it was announced that ScratchIt will be one of the movie's sponsors. ScratchIt also held a dance competition online where it called for people to submit videos of themselves doing a dance cover using the choreography and music featured in Lustre and Concepcion's ad. Prizes for the winners include P50,000 and a cameo appearance in the movie.

Soundtrack 
Indak (Official Movie Soundtrack) was released by Viva Records on June 21, 2019. It features music from Nadine Lustre, Sam Concepcion, Pio Balbuena, Shehyee, Julian Trono, Janine Tenoso, Thyro Alfaro, Yumi Lacsamana, and Just Hush.

Release
The film was released on August 7, 2019.

Television release
The film premiered on pay-per-view channel, KBO from December 20–25, 2019 and on Pinoy Box Office on February 22, 2020.

References

External links 

 
 Official Twitter page

2019 films
Viva Films films
2010s dance films
Philippine dance films
Philippine musical films
2010s musical films